Blues & Rhythm is a British monthly music magazine dealing with all aspects of blues and gospel music. Founded in July 1984 it is - along with its American counterpart Living Blues - considered to be the premier magazine for all aspects of research into blues and rhythm & blues music (pre- and post-war blues, rhythm and blues, doo-wop vocal groups, vintage soul, gospel and the contemporary blues scene).

Blues & Rhythm'''s team of writers and reviewers consists of record collectors, and some of the world's foremost experts on the history of blues/R&B/doo-wop/gospel and soul. Blues & Rhythm is run by an editorial board, since its inception it has carried on the long tradition of research into blues, R&B and gospel music including artists, musicians, record companies and associated subjects. Colin Larkin described the publication, along with Blueprint, and Juke Blues as "all admirable magazines".Blues & Rhythm's roots go back to magazines such as the pioneering Blues Unlimited, first published in England in the early 1960s, as well as other specialist magazines including Pickin' The Blues, Sailors Delight and Old Time Music.Blues & Rhythm'' has published major and ground-breaking research on some of the major blues musicians including Muddy Waters, Robert Johnson, Big Bill Broonzy, John Lee Hooker, B. B. King, T-Bone Walker and many others, and also specialises in searching out the lesser-known artists, obscure musicians and session musicians, as well as owners of record companies and details of record labels, who contributed to the rich and century-long history.

The magazine also features discographies, as well as reviews of recent blues festivals and gigs; news from the blues world; obituaries; and a lively letters pages where collectors and fans exchange information. The magazine's extensive review section covers all the latest new and reissue CDs; DVDs, vinyl, books etc.

It has also publishes updates and corrections to the most important published historical discographies of blues and gospel music.

In recent times the magazine has, in its review section, included vintage rock and roll, rockabilly, hillbilly/country and bluegrass music, as well as reviews of white blues and rock-blues releases from Europe and the United States.

Usually 48 pages in length, the magazine is published ten times a year, every five weeks.

References

External links
 Official site

1984 establishments in the United Kingdom
Blues music magazines
Gospel music media
Magazines established in 1984
Monthly magazines published in the United Kingdom
Music magazines published in the United Kingdom
Ten times annually magazines